KFWA 103.1 is a radio station licensed to Weldona, Colorado.

History
It originally was an oldies station, calling itself "Oldies 103.1". It later flipped to a simulcast of KAGM, a former country station in Strasburg. Currently, it airs country and contemporary-type music. KFWA also airs programming local to the eastern plains of Colorado on Sunday morning. The three Talk Shows on KFWA are the Frank and Patty Show, Dr. Cody Horton Show (www.codyhorton.com), and the Judge Wyld Show (www.judgewyld.com). The latter two shows also cross-marketed online to www.blogtalkradio.com/codyhorton and www.blogtalkradio.com/judgewyld and www.youtube.com.

External links

FWA
Country radio stations in the United States
Morgan County, Colorado